Defending champion Martina Navratilova and her partner Andrea Temesvári defeated Steffi Graf and Gabriela Sabatini in the final, 6–1, 6–2 to win the women's doubles tennis title at the 1986 French Open.

Navratilova and Pam Shriver were the two-time reigning champions, but Shriver did not participate this year.

Seeds

Draw

Finals

Top half

Section 1

Section 2

Bottom half

Section 3

Section 4

References
1986 French Open – Women's draws and results at the International Tennis Federation

Women's Doubles
French Open by year – Women's doubles
1986 in women's tennis
1986 in French women's sport